Leskovec ( or) is a small village in the hills north of Višnja Gora in the Municipality of Ivančna Gorica in central Slovenia. The area is part of the historical region of Lower Carniola. The municipality is now included in the Central Slovenia Statistical Region.

Church

The local church is dedicated to Saint Oswald and belongs to the Parish of Višnja Gora. It is a medieval building that was restyled in the Baroque in the 17th century.

References

External links

Leskovec on Geopedia

Populated places in the Municipality of Ivančna Gorica